Jack Baker may refer to:

 Jack Baker (actor) (1947–1994), American actor and writer
 Jack Baker (activist) (born 1942), American LGBT activist 
 Jack Baker (baseball) (born 1950), American baseball player
 Jack Baker (footballer, born 1878) (1878–1950), Australian footballer for Geelong
 Jack Baker Jr. (1891–1952), Australian footballer for Geelong
 Jack Baker (magician) (1913/1914–1980), American magician
 Jack Baker (rugby league) (1890–1947), Australian rugby league footballer
 Jimmy Baker (footballer, born 1904) (1904–1979), Welsh footballer also known as Jack Baker
 Jack Croft Baker (1894–1962), English businessman and local politician
 Jack Baker, head of the Baker family in the Resident Evil franchise

See also 
 John Baker (disambiguation)